The Adidas Cup 2000 was the 14th competition of the Korean League Cup, and one of two Korean League Cups held in 2000.

Bracket

Matches

First round

Quarter-finals

Semi-finals

Final

Awards

Source:

See also
2000 in South Korean football
2000 Korean League Cup (Supplementary Cup)
2000 K League
2000 Korean FA Cup

References

External links
Official website
RSSSF

2000
2000
2000 domestic association football cups
2000 in South Korean football